Thomas Adiel Sherwood (October 3, 1791 – August 19, 1879) was an American author and college president of Marshall College.

Biography
Sherwood was born in Fort Edward, New York, on October 3, 1791. His father was major Adiel Sherwood, an officer under Washington at Valley Forge and in the battle of Monmouth. Sherwood attended Middlebury College in Vermont and Union College in New York City. In 1819, he moved to Savannah, Georgia, where he involved himself with the Baptist ministry. He was instrumental in the founding of the Georgia Baptist Convention. He introduced and widened the support of the temperance movement after moving to Georgia. While in Georgia, his manual-labor system helped inspire the founding of Mercer University and in 1857, he became president of Marshall College in Griffin, Georgia. Between 1827 and 1860, he collected statistical information on Georgia’s counties and place names, which he compiled into his publication A Gazetteer of the State of Georgia. Sherwood published as many as five different editions between the years of 1827 and 1860. After his farm in Butts County, Georgia was burned by Sherman’s troops in the American Civil War, Sherwood moved to Missouri, where he died on August 19, 1879.  He was married to Emma Heriot, his second wife after his first wife and daughter died in 1824. He had five children. One son, Thomas Adiel Sherwood, served as a justice of the Missouri Supreme Court from 1873 to 1902.

Selected works
  (1829)
  (1854)
  (1860)
  (1861)
  (1862)
  (1863)

References

Further reading 
 
 

University and college founders
Heads of universities and colleges in the United States
1791 births
1879 deaths
American lexicographers
Baptists from Georgia (U.S. state)
People from Fort Edward, New York
Baptists from New York (state)
19th-century Baptists
19th-century lexicographers